The 2018 Junior League World Series took place from August 12–19 in Taylor, Michigan. Taoyuan, Taiwan defeated Lufkin, East Texas in the championship game. It was Taiwan's sixth straight championship.

The return of the Host Team raised the total number of teams to 12.

Teams

Results

United States Bracket

International Bracket

Elimination Round

References

Junior League World Series
Junior League World Series
Junior